For the most part, the history of forestry in Spain was one of increasing deforestation. Wood long was the main source of energy. In the 20th century, efforts were taken to revert the trend, increasing the forested area in the country from then on.

Forests cover roughly 55% of the land in Spain, with 70% privately owned and 27% on public land. The former amount wildly changes depending on the region, with Navarre accounting for the largest share of publicly owned forest and Galicia the smallest (MAGRAMA, 2012).

As of 2012, the most common tree species in Spanish forests are Pinus pinaster, Pinus sylvestris, species of eucalypts, Pinus halepensis, Fagus sylvatica, Pinus nigra, Quercus ilex, Quercus pyrenaica, Quercus pubescens, Pinus radiata, Quercus robur and Quercus petraea.

Forestry policy at the state level is included as part of the policy area of rural development of the relevant ministerial department. Much of the management of forestry, however, has been transferred at the regional level to different autonomous communities.

References 
Informational notes

Citations

Agriculture in Spain
Spain